The fourth and final season of the television series Live PD  began airing September 20, 2019, on A&E in the United States. The season concluded with the cancellation of the series, on May 23, 2020 and contained 65 episodes.

Departments

Departments returning from season three

Richland County (SC) Sheriff's Department
Salinas (CA) Police Department
Lawrence (IN) Police Department
East Providence (RI) Police Department
Lafayette (LA) Police Department
Greene County (MO) Sheriff's Office (Taped Segments only)
Nye County (NV) Sheriff's Office
Mission (TX) Police Department
Williamson County (TX) Sheriff’s Office

Department returning from season one

Tulsa (OK) Police Department

Departments debuting in season four

Tallahassee (FL) Police Department
Missoula County (MT) Sheriff's Office
Jefferson County (AL) Sheriff's Office
Terre Haute (IN) Police Department
Bradford County (FL) Sheriff's Office
Berkeley County Sheriff's Office 
Pomona (CA) Police Department
Volusia County (FL) Sheriffs Office 
Clay County (FL) Sheriff’s Office
West Baton Rouge (LA) Sheriffs Office

Episodes 
Season four premiered on September 20, 2019.

Production
Ahead of the fourth season premiere on September 19, 2019, it was announced that Live PD would be returning to follow the Tulsa Oklahoma Police Department. Live PD had previously followed the department but they declined the option to renew their original contract when it ended in 2016. The Tulsa city mayor cited a reason for returning as beneficial experience. The Tallahassee Florida Police Department and the Missoula County Montana Sheriff's Office were also both announced to be joining the series. On October 17, 2019 it was announced that Live PD would be leaving the Salinas, California police department. Despite recent community backlash at the time, Salinas Mayor said that it was the production companies choice to leave the city stating "I understand they have some offers for other cities that are more exciting and faster-paced, someone told me that we were boring." The decision to leave the city comes less than two months after the network signed a new two-year contract with the department.

Impact of the COVID-19 pandemic
When the World Health Organization declared the COVID-19 pandemic to be a pandemic on March 11, 2020, Live PD was about to enter a previously scheduled two-week production hiatus following that week's episodes; the show had a hiatus for the NCAA Division I men's basketball tournament during its first three seasons. During the prescheduled hiatus, A&E announced some changes to the format of the show, which would require the presenters of the program to work from their own homes. As a result of this change, the Roll Call pre-show was temporarily discontinued after the March 14 episode, and the show itself was temporarily reduced to two hours each on Fridays and Saturdays. The episodes that were aired during the month of April focused on the impact of the pandemic on law enforcement officers. The normal format of the show would be restored beginning with the May 9 episode.

Impact of the murder of George Floyd and related protests
The 299th and 300th episodes of the show were originally scheduled to air on June 5, and 6, 2020, respectively, with a special episode planned for the 300th on June 6. Five hours before the episode was scheduled to air it was announced that both episodes had been pulled from the schedule amid nationwide protests that were a direct result of the murder of George Floyd. A&E stated in a press release that the decision not to air the episodes was made "out of respect for the families of George Floyd and others who have lost their lives" as well as the safety of those involved with the production of the series. Repeat episodes of spin-off series Live Rescue aired in the episodes place with new episodes of Live PD tentatively scheduled for June 12, and 13. However, the show was subsequently cancelled on June 10.

References 

Live PD
2019 American television seasons
2020 American television seasons